The following is a list of current (entering 2022–23 NHL season) National Hockey League broadcasters. With 25 teams in the U.S. and 7 in Canada, the NHL is the only one of the four major professional sports leagues in the United States and Canada that maintains separate national broadcasters in each country, each producing separate telecasts of a slate of regular season games, playoff games, and all seven games of the Stanley Cup Finals. Games are also shown on multiple regional sports networks in both countries.

Regional broadcasters
The following is a list of local TV and radio broadcasters for each individual team. As a result of Rogers Communications and Bell Canada having both an ownership stake in the Toronto Maple Leafs, that team's regional English language TV broadcasts are split between Rogers' Sportsnet Ontario and Bell's TSN4, and radio coverage is split between Sportsnet 590 and TSN 1050. The Buffalo Sabres, Carolina Hurricanes, and Dallas Stars do television/radio simulcasts. Both the Los Angeles Kings and the New Jersey Devils lack flagship terrestrial radio stations, and have instead partnered with the Internet radio platforms iHeartRadio and Audacy, respectively; the San Jose Sharks likewise abandoned terrestrial radio, instead keeping all audio broadcasts exclusive to its own online platforms. Both the Montreal Canadiens and Ottawa Senators each have local English and French language broadcasts to serve their large anglophone and francophone fan bases. The Florida Panthers, Chicago Blackhawks, and Vegas Golden Knights have all added Spanish language broadcasts to serve their Hispanic fan bases. Not all teams televise their preseason games.

Eastern Conference

Western Conference

National broadcasters

Canada

National television rights in Canada are held by Rogers Media. CBC Television, the previous over-the-air television broadcaster of the NHL, continues to participate in coverage to an extent: Rogers reached a deal with CBC to license the Hockey Night in Canada brand and maintain the network's traditional Saturday night games. HNIC games now airs nationally across CBC, Citytv, and the Sportsnet channels, rather than be split across CBC stations on a regional basis. FX Canada was originally also used to show games (usually simulcasts of all-American matchups), but has not carried regular season or playoff broadcasts since the first year of the Rogers contract. Sportsnet also airs a primetime game of the week on Monday nights, known as Rogers Monday Night Hockey since 2022, and exclusive Wednesday night games under the Scotiabank Wednesday Night Hockey brand. On other days of the week, Sportsnet's national broadcasts typically feature all-American matchups, carrying a simulcast of either ESPN, Turner Sports or a home team's network. On a few occasions, regional Sportsnet broadcasts of Canucks, Flames, Maple Leafs and Oilers games are also aired nationally, with the host team's network in charge of in-game coverage. During the playoffs, games are split between CBC and the Sportsnet channels, though some games aired on CBC may also be simulcast on Sportsnet.

Sportsnet previously aired a national NHL telecast on Sunday (2014–2020) and Monday nights (2021–2022) under the Hometown Hockey brand.

Additionally, the Quebecor Media-owned TVA Sports receives French-language rights as part of another sub-licensing deal with Rogers. Hockey Night in Canada is also broadcast in the Punjabi language via Rogers-owned Omni Television.

Announcers

United States

National television rights in English language in the United States are held by ESPN/ABC and Turner Sports, with ESPN Deportes broadcasting games in the Spanish language. During the regular season, ESPN, TBS, and TNT airs most nationally televised games. Most national games on ESPN would not be available on television; instead they are streamed online exclusively on ESPN+.  ABC will also air a select number of games nationally. The NHL Network in the U.S. also regularly airs games, but primarily simulcasts of either a regional or Canadian feed. Starting in 2021, Saturday (early-season) or Sunday (mid-late season) afternoon games on NHL Network were rebranded as the NHL Network Showcase, using the network's on-air staff instead of merely simulcasting a regional feed.

All nationally televised regular season games on ESPN and ABC are exclusive broadcasts; games on TNT may co-exist with regional networks. Likewise, games produced by ESPN that stream on ESPN+ are exclusive and not available to co-exist with the regional networks. Except for playoff games aired on ABC, first round playoff games may be aired by the local networks alongside ESPN and TNT, but all playoff games from the second round onward would be exclusive to either of the three networks.

Announcers

International broadcasters

Africa

America

Asia

Europe

Oceania

See also 

NHL networks
 NHL Network (United States)
 NHL Network (Canada) (2001–2015)

Out-of-market packages

 NHL Center Ice (U.S.)
 NHL Centre Ice (Canada)
 National Hockey League on television
 List of current Major League Baseball broadcasters
 List of current Major League Soccer broadcasters
 List of current National Basketball Association broadcasters
 List of current National Football League broadcasters

References

External links
 International broadcasters

 
National Hockey League on television
National Hockey League on the radio
NHL
National Hockey League broadcasters